Jason Burke (born 1970) is a British journalist and the author of several non-fiction books. A correspondent covering Africa for The Guardian, he is currently based in Johannesburg, having previously been based in New Delhi as the same paper's South Asia correspondent. In his years of journalism, Burke has addressed a wide range of topics including politics, social affairs and culture in Europe and the Middle East. He has written extensively on Islamic extremism and, among numerous other conflicts, covered the wars of 2001 in Afghanistan and 2003 in Iraq, the latter of which he described as "entirely justifiable from a humanitarian perspective".

In 2003, Burke wrote Al-Qaeda: Casting a Shadow of Terror, which was later updated and republished as Al-Qaeda: The True Story of Radical Islam. Noam Chomsky described it as the "best book there is" on Al-Qaeda. He was interviewed in the 2004 BBC documentary The Power of Nightmares. In 2006, he wrote On the Road to Kandahar: Travels through Conflict in the Islamic World.

Biography
Burke attended Oxford University. For four years, he held a position as an investigative reporter at the Sunday Times. He relocated to Pakistan in 1998 to cover events there and in Afghanistan. During this period, he also travelled to Baghdad and Basra. Around 2000, he was hired by The Observer to serve as its chief foreign correspondent. Since then, he has become the South Asia correspondent for The Guardian, The Observer'''s sister publication, as well. As of 2010, he is based in New Delhi.

Prior to his assignment to New Delhi, Burke was based in Afghanistan, Pakistan, and Paris, but his work has taken him to many locations. According to a book review in 2006 in The Daily Telegraph, Burke "is one of the journalistic band of brothers whose job is to get to the trouble spots ahead of the TV crews and show the electronic media what it is all about". His travels have included Gaza, Kurdistan, Thailand, Algeria, and Jordan, among others.
Burke also wrote "On the Road to Kandahar", and more recently the critically acclaimed "9/11 Wars" released in October 2011 which he discusses in detail in issue 5 of Umbrella Magazine.

According to an article in Asharq Al-Awsat in 2009, Burke was the "first journalist to conduct an interview with President Pervez Musharraf after he seized power in Pakistan in October 1999" and "the first western journalist to enter the Afghan city of Khost during the US war in Afghanistan".

BibliographyAl-Qaeda: The True Story of Radical IslamAl-Qaeda: Casting a Shadow of TerrorOn the Road to Kandahar: Travels through Conflict in the Islamic World,The 9/11 WarsThe New Threat: The Past, Present, and Future of Islamic Militancy''

References

External links
Guernica: A Magazine of Art and Politics: "The Price of Oranges"
LiberalOasis Interviews Jason Burke
Extract: Al-Qaeda: Casting a Shadow of Terror
Article in online magazine, Umbrella Magazine

1970 births
Living people
British reporters and correspondents
War correspondents of the Iraq War
War correspondents of the War in Afghanistan (2001–2021)
British non-fiction writers
Alumni of Pembroke College, Oxford
British male writers
Male non-fiction writers